Ward is a rural locality in the Shire of Murweh, Queensland, Australia. In the  Ward had a population of 74 people.

Geography 
The Ward River enters the locality from the north (Bayrick) and then flows south through the locality becoming a tributary of the Langlo River in the south of the locality.

Glengarry is a neighbourhood in the south of the locality.

Meecha is a neighbourhood in the far south of the locality.

Castle Hill is in the centre of the locality.

The land use is almost entirely grazing on native vegetation.

History 
Meecha was surveyed for a town site by A. T. Macfarlane on 17 March 1891. Two of the 20 town lots were purchased on 30 January 1894 and were held until ownership was transferred to Murweh Shire Council on 30 July 1968 and then became Crown land on 15 September 1977.

The locality was named and bounded on 28 March 2002.

Economy 
There are a number of homesteads in the locality:

 Aubigny
 Balmacarra
 Barford
 Binga Minor
 Brumich
 Buckeys Creek
 Calowne
 Conargo
 Gleneden
 Laguna
 Maxvale
 Millie
 Molonga
 Newholme
 Oak Park
 Oakwood
 Old Gowrie
 Oxford Downs
 Perola Park
 Southampton Downs
 Thurlby
 Wansey Downs
 Wardsdale

Transport 
Wanko railway station is on the Western railway line, but on the section from Westgate to Quilpie which has not been used since 2011.  A small refreshment stand operated at Wanko station in the era when passenger rail travel to these Western locations was common.

Education 
There are no schools in Ward. The nearest primary schools are Augathella State School in neighbouring Augathella to the east and Charleville State School in neighbouring Charleville to the south. The nearest secondary school is Charleville State High School.

In the  Ward had a population of 74 people.

Amenities 
It is managed by the Murweh Shire Council.

References 

Shire of Murweh
Localities in Queensland